Fürstenberg Castle may refer to the following castles in Germany:

 Fürstenberg Castle (Rheindiebach), Oberdiebach-Rheindiebach, Rhineland-Palatinate
 Fürstenberg Castle (Hüfingen), Hüfingen-Fürstenberg, Baden-Württemberg
 Fürstenberg Castle (Höingen), Ense-Höingen, North Rhine-Westphalia

See also 
 Fürstenberg (disambiguation)

de:Burg Fürstenberg